In functional analysis, a branch of mathematics, an operator ideal is a special kind of class of continuous linear operators between Banach spaces.

Formal definition

Let  denote the class of continuous linear operators acting between arbitrary Banach spaces.
(1)  If  then ; and

Properties and examples

Operator ideals enjoy the following nice properties.

 Every operator ideal contains all finite-rank operators.  In particular, the finite-rank operators form the smallest operator ideal.
 For each operator ideal , every component of the form  forms an ideal in the algebraic sense.

Furthermore, some very well-known classes are norm-closed operator ideals, i.e., operator ideals whose components are always norm-closed.  These include but are not limited to the following.

 Compact operators
 Weakly compact operators
 Finitely strictly singular operators
 Strictly singular operators
 Completely continuous operators

References
 Pietsch, Albrecht: Operator Ideals, Volume 16 of Mathematische Monographien, Deutscher Verlag d. Wiss., VEB, 1978.

Functional analysis